Leeuwenbergia is a plant genus of the family Euphorbiaceae first described as a genus in 1974 and named in honor of Toon Leeuwenberg. The entire genus is endemic to tropical west-central Africa.

Species
 Leeuwenbergia africana Letouzey & N.Hallé - Cameroon, Gabon, Republic of the Congo, Democratic Republic of the Congo 
 Leeuwenbergia letestui Letouzey & N.Hallé - Gabon

References

Jatropheae
Flora of West-Central Tropical Africa
Euphorbiaceae genera